David Bradley Carter (born December 5, 1973) is an American film and television actor, guitarist, painter, sculptor, and photographer, known for playing Charlie Lange in True Detective and Leland Gruen in Sons of Anarchy.

After suffering from brain disease and tremors that caused his hands to shake, he underwent brain surgery in 2013, which he recorded and posted on YouTube. The video went viral, and he became known as the "guy playing guitar during brain surgery".

Early life and education
Carter was born in Fort Worth, Texas, and raised in Macon, Georgia. He graduated with a Bachelor of Fine Arts degree from Valdosta State University, located in Valdosta, Georgia.

Career 
In 2010, Carter made guest appearances in It's Always Sunny in Philadelphia, Disney's Zeke and Luther, Justified, True Blood, and New Girl. He portrayed Rankin in one episode of the Showtime series Dexter, wherein his character was killed.

In 2012–13, Carter made guest appearances in The Mentalist, Bones, Longmire, and CSI: Crime Scene Investigation.

In 2014, Carter made guest appearances in two episodes of HBO's True Detective opposite Matthew McConaughey as Charlie Lange, an ex-husband of murdered Dora Lange, the case around which the series revolves. Later, he portrayed Leland Gruen, an Aryan Brotherhood member, in three episodes of FX's Sons of Anarchy. Then he played John Stokes, a stockyard master, in the miniseries Ascension.

In 2015, Carter starred in the film Dixieland, and portrayed murder victim John McIntyre in Black Mass, directed by Scott Cooper, and based on a true story. Carter appeared in the drama The Revenant (2015), opposite Leonardo DiCaprio and Tom Hardy, directed by Alejandro González Iñárritu. He will also appear in the upcoming film Eat Me opposite Michael Shamus Wiles, directed by Adrian Cruz.

Brain surgery 
Nader Pouratian, director of UCLA's Neurosurgical Movement Disorders Program, performed brain surgery on Carter twice, in January and March 2013. The first surgery was to implant electrodes in his brain, and the second was to put wires down his neck. Carter had first noticed tremors in his hands in 2006, which were misdiagnosed as symptoms of Lyme disease by three specialists. During the operation, Carter needed to be awake for the best results, so his doctors suggested that he play guitar during his operation to see when his tremors weakened.

A video recording was made of Carter's operation, which was later posted on YouTube. The video went viral and received media attention worldwide. Carter became known as the "guy playing guitar during brain surgery." The hospital staff had requested the video recording to help allay those suffering from similar diseases who were curious about the surgery.

Filmography

Film

Television

Videogames

References

External links 
 , his official website
 

1973 births
21st-century American male actors
21st-century American painters
21st-century American sculptors
21st-century American male artists
American male sculptors
Actors from Macon, Georgia
American male film actors
American male guitarists
American male television actors
American photographers
Male actors from Fort Worth, Texas
Male actors from Georgia (U.S. state)
Musicians from Macon, Georgia
Living people
Painters from Georgia (U.S. state)
Painters from Texas
Valdosta State University alumni
21st-century American guitarists
American male painters
Guitarists from Georgia (U.S. state)
Guitarists from Texas
Sculptors from Texas
21st-century American male musicians